Bessie Morse Bellingrath (1878 – 1943) was an Alabama philanthropist known for developing the Bellingrath Gardens and Home, the historic home of Bessie Morse Bellingrath and her husband, Mobile Coca-Cola Company president Walter Bellingrath. Bellingrath is remembered for her work creating the Bellingrath Gardens, as well as offering people hundreds of dollars in exchange for flowers for the gardens during a period of economic hardship. She was an honorary member-at-large of the Garden Clubs of America, and has been inducted into the Alabama Women's Hall of Fame.

Early life
Bellingrath was born in Mobile, Alabama, in 1878. She grew up as one of nine children in the family. Bellingrath studied the arts before becoming a stenographer at the Mobile Coca-Cola Company. She went on to marry Walter Bellingrath, the founder of Mobile's Coca-Cola bottling company. She left her job as a stenographer and instead began cultivating gardens at the couple's South Ann Street home in Mobile. Her love of azaleas in particular became the basis for Mobile's Azalea Trail.

Home and gardens
Bellingrath later suggested that the couple develop "Belle Camp," which was traditionally used as a fishing hole. She planted azaleas and camellias there, and eventually built the property into a large garden with a 15-room Renaissance mansion, the Bellingrath Home. Bessie was known for buying plants from struggling locals during the Great Depression, overpaying them because of the economic hardship of the era. She would tell people that she had been looking for that exact flower and that it had been hard to obtain, even when it was a very common plant.

Death and legacy
Bellingrath died in 1943, at the age of 64. In 1950, her husband, Walter, created the Bellingrath-Morse Foundation to maintain the home and gardens and keep them open to the public.

References 

1878 births
1943 deaths
People from Mobile, Alabama
American gardeners